2022 Birmingham Games may refer to:

2022 Commonwealth Games, held in Birmingham, England
2022 World Games, held in Birmingham, Alabama